Roosevelt was a Vintage era marque of an American automobile that was manufactured by the Marmon Motor Car Company of Indianapolis, Indiana, during the 1929 and 1930 model years.

History 
The Roosevelt  was named after President Theodore Roosevelt and designed to be priced as an "affordable" automobile, and advertising used the tag line Smart Transportation for the Thrifty.  The Roosevelt was the first automobile in America with a straight-eight engine to be priced under $1,000, with the sedan and coupe selling for $995, .

Although the Roosevelt name did not appear for the 1931 range of Marmon models, the car was refined into the new Model 70 Marmon.

Sales in 1929 approached 24,500 automobiles, considered an excellent first year for a new marque. One of the unique features of the Roosevelt was the horn button.  It served 3 purposes.  Push down and it would honk, pull up and it was the starter, and turn it, to turn the head lights on and off.  It also had a cameo of Theodore Roosevelt, black and white, on the front top middle of the radiator.

References

External links
1929 Roosevelt Victoria coupe
1930 Roosevelt coupe
Roosevelt 8 at ConceptCarz

Companies based in Indianapolis
Defunct manufacturing companies based in Indiana
Defunct motor vehicle manufacturers of the United States
Vehicle manufacturing companies established in 1929
Vehicle manufacturing companies disestablished in 1930
Motor vehicle manufacturers based in Indiana
Vintage vehicles
Pre-war vehicles
1920s cars
1930s cars
Cars introduced in 1929